Emilios Panayiotou (born 22 September 1992 in Limassol, Cyprus) is a Cypriot footballer who plays as a midfielder for AEZ Zakakiou in the Cypriot Second Division.

Career
He made his first football steps at the age of six at Polemidia and a year later he joined AEL Limassol academies. After a test in PSV Eindhoven, Emilios joined the Academies of Nikodimos Papavasiliou. In 2007, after having passed through tests in Manchester City, Southampton and AJ Auxerre, he joined the academies of Sochaux. 
Two years later, he returned to Cyprus and signed a contract with APOEL. On 10 February 2010, he made his debut with APOEL in a Cypriot Cup match against Ermis Aradippou, coming on as a substitute in the 72nd minute.

On 29 August 2012, Emilios joined Olympiakos Nicosia on a season-long loan deal from APOEL. He appeared in 15 league matches and scored one goal against AEP Paphos on 9 December 2012, in Olympiakos' 3–1 home win.

The summer of 2013, he moved again on a season-long loan deal from APOEL to the Cypriot First Division side Alki Larnaca.

In September 2014, Emilios signed a contract with Aris Limassol.

References

External links
 APOEL Official Profile
 

1992 births
Living people
Sportspeople from Limassol
Cypriot footballers
APOEL FC players
Olympiakos Nicosia players
Association football midfielders
Greek Cypriot people